Guadalupe Pass is a mountain pass located in the Guadalupe Mountains of Hidalgo County, New Mexico. It lies at an elevation of 5075 feet or 1547 m.

History
Guadalupe Pass was used first by the Spanish and then by the Mexicans for Janos - Fronteras Road between Chihuahua and Fronteras, Sonora from the late 17th century.  In 1846, American soldiers of the Mormon Battalion led by Philip St. George Cooke used the pass and the old road for the route of Cooke's Wagon Road between the pass and the San Pedro River.  This road was heavily used by the 49ers during the California Gold Rush.  It was soon after replaced by a more direct route, the Tucson Cutoff to the north.

References

External links
  John Russell Bartlet, Guadalupe Pass, on Cooke’s Road—Sonora, August 4, 1852, sepia and wash on beige paper from jcb.lunaimaging.com, John Carter Brown Library, Brown University.

Landforms of Hidalgo County, New Mexico
Mountain passes of New Mexico
Transportation in Hidalgo County, New Mexico
Cooke's Wagon Road